Hiltonius is a genus of cylindrical millipedes in the family Spirobolidae comprising 10 species ranging from the southwestern United States to Guatemala, with most species being found in Mexico. The genus was named by Ralph Vary Chamberlin in 1918, after Professor William A. Hilton of Pomona College who collected the type specimen of  H. pulchrus.

Description
The eyes are composed of patches of ocelli, widely spaced, containing 21 to 37 ocelli per patch. The legs are short, usually not reaching the sides of the body when held horizontally. Like many other spirobolids, color ranges from brown to nearly black, and thin bands of red or yellow may occur on the rear margins of each segment.

Species
Hiltonius contains 10 named species. Some have wide distributions while others are known only from the type locality- the place where the type specimens were initially discovered. The northernmost species are H. pulchrus and H. carpinus, ranging into southern California and northern Arizona, respectively. A subspecies of H. carpinus occurs in an isolated population in Guatemala.

Similar species
Hiltonius co-occurs with some species of Tylobolus in southern California. Tylobolus species can be distinguished by larger maximum size (up to 92 mm or 3.6 in long), having more ocelli per eye patch (27–50), a larger hooked process on the coxa of the third leg in males, and in details of the gonopods, male reproductive structures.

References

External links

Hiltonius on BugGuide

Spirobolida
Millipedes of North America